Wonga Temple or Wongaksa is a South Korean Buddhist temple on the Geumnam street in the Dong-gu district, Gwangju city. Situated in the downtown of the metropolitan city, this is a branch temple of the Songgwang temple in Suncheon and belongs to the Jogye Order of Korean Buddhism. It was founded in 1914 by Master Geumbong Girim (錦峯基林) of Seonam temple as its missionary center in Gwangju.

See also
Korean Buddhist temples
Korean Buddhism

References

External links
Temple website

1914 establishments in Korea
Religious organizations established in 1914
Buddhist temples in South Korea
Jogye Order
Buildings and structures in Gwangju